In mathematical analysis, a Banach limit is a continuous linear functional  defined on the Banach space  of all bounded complex-valued sequences such that for all sequences ,  in , and complex numbers :
  (linearity);
 if  for all , then  (positivity);
 if  is a convergent sequence, then . 

In other words, a Banach limit extends the usual limits, is linear, shift-invariant and positive.  However, there exist sequences for which the values of two Banach limits do not agree.  We say that the Banach limit is not uniquely determined in this case.

As a consequence of the above properties, a real-valued Banach limit also satisfies:

 

The existence of Banach limits is usually proved using the Hahn–Banach theorem (analyst's approach), or using ultrafilters (this approach is more frequent in set-theoretical expositions). These proofs necessarily use the axiom of choice (so called non-effective proof).

Almost convergence
There are non-convergent sequences which have a uniquely determined Banach limit.  For example, if , then  is a constant sequence, and

holds.  Thus, for any Banach limit, this sequence has limit .

A bounded sequence  with the property, that for every Banach limit  the value  is the same, is called almost convergent.

Banach spaces
if the duality  is considered.

External links

References

 

Functional analysis